Follow Your Heart is the debut album by electronic dance music group Cubic Zirconia. The album was released by Fool's Gold Records on September 20, 2011.

Track listing
 "Yellow Spaceship Pt 2"
 "Darko"
 "Black Hole"
 "Summertime"
 "Treats"
 "Take Me High"
 "Freebase You"
 "Follow Your Heart"
 "Cherry Nights" (feat. Coultrane)
 "Runnin In And Out Of Love" (feat. Drop The Lime)
 "Don’t Be Scared Of My Love"
 "I Got What You Need" (feat. Dam-Funk)
 "Night Or Day" (feat. Bilal)

Personnel
 Tiombe Lockhart - vocals
 Nick Hook - keyboards, production
 Daud Sturdivant - keyboards, percussion
 Jamire Williams - drums
 Lenny Castro - percussion	
 John Kuker - production

References

2011 debut albums
Fool's Gold Records albums